Antimilitarism (also spelt anti-militarism) is a doctrine that opposes war, relying heavily on a critical theory of imperialism and was an explicit goal of the First and Second International. Whereas pacifism is the doctrine that disputes (especially between countries) should be settled without recourse to violence, Paul B. Miller defines anti-militarism as "ideology and activities...aimed at reducing the civil power of the military and ultimately, preventing international war". Cynthia Cockburn defines an anti-militarist movement as one opposed to "military rule, high military expenditure or the imposition of foreign bases in their country". Martin Ceadel points out that anti-militarism is sometimes equated with pacificism—general opposition to war or violence, except in cases where force is deemed necessary to advance the cause of peace.<ref name="mc">Martin Ceadel, 'Thinking about peace and war. Oxford, Oxford University Press, 1987. , p. 101.</ref>

 Distinction between antimilitarism and pacifism 
Pacifism is the belief that disputes between nations can and should be settled peacefully. It is the opposition to war and the use of violence as a means of settling disputes. It can include the refusal to participate in military action.

Antimilitarism does not reject war in all circumstances, but rejects the belief or desire to maintain a large and strong military organization in aggressive preparedness for war.

Criticisms on violence

Anarcho-syndicalist Georges Sorel advocated the use of violence as a form of direct action, calling it "revolutionary violence", which he opposed in Reflections on Violence (1908) to the violence inherent in class struggle. Similarities are seen between Sorel and the International Workingmens' Association (IWA) theorization of propaganda of the deed.

Walter Benjamin, in his Critique of Violence (1920) demarcates a difference between "violence that founds the law", and "violence that conserves the law", on one hand, and on the other hand, a "divine violence" that breaks the "magic circle" between both types of "state violence".  What distinguishes these two kinds of violence fundamentally is their mode of operation; whereas law-establishing and law-preserving violence operate instrumentally on a continuum of means and ends, wherein the means of physical violence justify the political-juridical ends of the law, the Benjaminian concept of 'divine violence' is unique insofar as it is a bloodless violence 'of pure means' through which the law itself is destroyed. The example Benjamin provides in his essay is that of a General Strike, the latter of which is a key element of Sorel's Reflections on Violence (cited in this essay by Benjamin). The "violence that conserves the law" is roughly equivalent to the state's monopoly of legitimate violence. The "violence that founds the law" is the original violence necessary to the creation of a state. "Revolutionary violence" removes itself from the sphere of the law by shattering its instrumental logic of violence  (i.e. its deployment of violence as a means of instituting, preserving and enforcing its own authority).  

Giorgio Agamben showed the theoretical link between the law and violence permitted Nazi-thinker Carl Schmitt to justify the "state of exception" as the characteristic of sovereignty. Thus indefinite suspension of the law may only be blocked by breaking this link between violence and right.

 Henry David Thoreau's anti-military views 

Henry David Thoreau's 1849 essay "Civil Disobedience" (see text), originally titled "Resistance to Civil Government", can be considered an antimilitarist point of view. His refusal to pay taxes is justified as an act of protest against slavery and against the Mexican–American War, in accordance with the practice of civil disobedience. (1846–48). He writes in his essay that the individual is not with obligations to the majority of the State. Instead, the individual should "break the law" if the law is "of such a nature that it requires you to be the agent of injustice to another."

Capitalism and the military–industrial complex
Capitalism has often been thought by antimilitarist literature to be a major cause of wars, an influence which has been theorized by Vladimir Lenin and Rosa Luxemburg under the name of "imperialism". The military–industrial complex has been accused of "pushing for war" in pursuit of private economic or financial interests.

The Second International was opposed to the participation of the working classes in war, which was analyzed as a competition between different national bourgeois classes and different state imperialisms. The assassination of French socialist leader Jean Jaurès days before the proclamation of World War I resulted in massive participation in the coming war. In Mars; or, The Truth About War'' (1921), Alain criticizes the destruction brought about by militarism, and demonstrated that it wasn't patriotism that forced the soldiers to fight, but the bayonets behind them.

After World War II, US President Eisenhower's 1961 issued a warning on the influence of the "military–industrial complex".

Right-wing antimilitarism in the United States 
American right-wing antimilitarists draw heavily upon the statements of Thomas Jefferson and other Founding Fathers condemning standing armies and foreign entanglements. Jefferson's beliefs on maintaining a standing army are as follows: "There are instruments so dangerous to the rights of the nation and which place them so totally at the mercy of their governors that those governors, whether legislative or executive, should be restrained from keeping such instruments on foot but in well-defined cases. Such an instrument is a standing army."

Right-wing antimilitarists in the United States generally believe that "A well regulated militia, composed of the body of the people, trained to arms, is the best and most natural defense of a free country", as stated by James Madison. To this end, there is much overlap between the Militia movement and right-wing antimilitarists, although the two groups are not mutually inclusive. The term "well regulated" in the above quote (and in the Second Amendment to the United States Constitution) is taken by such antimilitarists not to mean "regulated by the state" but rather "well equipped" and "in good working order", as was a common usage of the word "regulated" in the late 18th century.

Antimilitarism in Japan
After World War II Japan enacted its postwar constitution which, in Article 9, stated that "The Japanese people forever renounce war as a sovereign right of the nation and the threat or use of force as means of settling international disputes." Such antimilitarist constitution was based on the belief that Japan's military organizations were to blame for thrusting the country into World War II.

In Yasuhiro Izumikawa's article "Explaining Japanese Antimilitarism: Normative and Realist Constraints on Japan's Security Policy", the evidences for the constructivist's belief in the existence of the single norm of antimilitarism in Post war Japan are introduced. These evidences include the Yoshida Doctrine, adopted after the World War II, which emphasized the importance of Japan’s economic development and acceptance of the U.S. security umbrella. Also, the institutional constraints imposed on Japan’s security policy after World War II and Japan’s Three Non-Nuclear Principles which is about not possessing, producing, or permitting the introduction of nuclear  weapons into Japan are mentioned as the evidence for antimilitarism. In contrast to the constructivist's view, in Izumikawa's article, the realists are said to believe that the postwar security policy in Japan is a combination of pacifism, antitraditionalism, and the fear of entrapment rather than just being based on the single norm of antimilitarism.

However, the postwar constitution on which Japan’s antimilitarism is based has seen some proposed amendments, and article 9 has been renounced by the Liberal Democratic Party. Some new legislation allows Japan’s Self Defense Forces to act more like a conventional army, reinterpreting the constitutional restrictions. This legislation has been strongly opposed by Japanese opposition parties, especially the Japanese Communist Party, which is strongly opposed to militarism.

Antimilitarist groups 

Until its dissolution, the Second International was antimilitarist. Jaurès' assassination on July 31, 1914, marks antimilitarism's failure in the socialist movement. The American Union Against Militarism is an example of a US antimilitarist movement born in the midst of the First World War, from which the American Civil Liberties Union (ACLU) formed after the war. In 1968, Benjamin Spock signed the "Writers and Editors War Tax Protest" pledge, vowing to refuse tax payments in protest against the Vietnam War.  He was also arrested for his involvement in anti-war protests resulting from his signing of the anti-war manifesto "A Call to Resist Illegitimate Authority" circulated by members of the collective RESIST.  The individuals arrested during this incident came to be known as the Boston Five.

Some Refuseniks in Israel, who refuse the draft, and draft resisters in the USA can be considered by some to be antimilitarist or pacifist.

War Resisters' International, formed in 1921, is an international network of pacifist and animilitarist groups around the world, currently with 90 affiliated groups in over 40 countries.

See also 

2015 Japanese military legislation
Anti-war movement
Arms and the Man/The Chocolate Soldier a comedy by George Bernard Shaw
Campaign for Nuclear Disarmament
Civilian control of the military
Conscientious objector
Counter-recruitment
Criticism of capitalism
Demilitarisation
Draft evasion
Insubordinate movement in Spain
Just war theory
List of countries without armed forces
Militarism
Non-violence
Peace Pledge Union
Peace treaty
Peace
Peace process
Refusal to serve in the Israeli military
Socialism
Soldiers are murderers
Stop the War Coalition
Three Non-Nuclear Principles
War resister
War Resisters' International
War
Yoshida Doctrine
Zimmerwald Conference

References

External links 
 Karl Liebknecht book "Militarism and Anti-Militarism"
 John Palatella, "The War of Words"

 
Activism by issue
Anti-war movement
Pacifism
Political theories
Social philosophy
Socialism